Urszula Beata Kasprzak, usually known simply as Urszula, (born 7 February 1960 in Lublin, Poland) is a Polish pop and rock singer and also a piano player and accordionist.

She recorded 15 albums, her music was used in TV and cinema films, and she acted in several films herself.

She gained popularity in Poland especially after recording music with the Polish rock band Budka Suflera.

Discography

Studio albums

Compilation albums

Live albums

References

External links
 Official website

1960 births
Living people
Musicians from Lublin
Polish women singers
Polish pop singers
Polish rock singers